The Solomon Ministry was the 41st Ministry of the Government of South Australia, led by Vaiben Louis Solomon. It commenced on 1 December 1899, following the defeat of the Kingston Ministry over proposed extensions to suffrage, but lasted only a week before it was ousted in favour of the new Leader of the Opposition, Frederick Holder, who formed the Second Holder Ministry on 8 December 1899. It was the shortest-lived ministry in the history of South Australia.

References

South Australian ministries